Presentation programs for preparing and delivering online video presentations have a place in educational instruction. They enable presentation of teaching materials in the form of a slide show or as a screencast. Among such packages Microsoft PowerPoint is the most widely used in instructional contexts. The live instructor retains a vital role in delivering the presentation.

Features of MS PowerPoint
MS PowerPoint has become the dominant presentation tool because it is both readily available and easy for instructors to use (Grabe & Grabe 2007). It allows instructors to create and manipulate presentations in a wide variety of contexts that can enhance student’s interest and engagement (Mills & Roblyer, 2006). In addition, it helps instructors clearly identify the main points of a topic or activity while still providing the details through presentation (Loisel & Galer, 2004). Instructors can incorporate multiple types of media formats (e.g., diagram, photo, drawing, sound and video) that cannot be easily integrated together into one single medium. PowerPoint also provides graphical, transactional, aesthetic and interactive features. PowerPoint is for use in the classroom, and needs to be paired with use of an LCD projector and large screen.

The role of the instructor
In order to be successful, an instructor needs to guide the audience through the presentation, keep their interest, and attract their attention (Chiasson & Gutwin, 2005).

See also
 Presentation slide
 Comparison of screencasting software
 Educational technology

References

Educational technology
Presentation software